The Brookline-Newfane Bridge is a historic bridge spanning the West River between Brookline and Newfane, Vermont on Grassy Brook Road.  It is a camelback through truss bridge, built in 1928 by the Berlin Construction Company in the wake of Vermont's devastating 1927 floods.  The bridge was listed on the National Register of Historic Places in 2007 as Bridge 19, at which time it was one of seven surviving camelback bridges in the state.  It last underwent a major rehabilitation in 2003-4.

Description and history
The Brookline-Newfane Bridge is located on the West River, which forms the town line between northeastern Newfane and southwestern Brookline. The road it carries is called Grassy Brook Road (or Town Highway 1) in Brookline and Radway Hill Road (Town Highway 4) in Newfane. The bridge, which is owned jointly by the two towns, is the principal means of access to Brookline from the south, and Grassy Brook Road is the town's principal thoroughfare. A steel I-beamed approach span of  provides access to the bridge on the Brookline side.

A bridge has probably stood on this site as early as 1782, when the road linking the two towns was surveyed. It is not known how many bridges have stood there; the bridge destroyed by the 1927 flooding was a Town lattice truss bridge. Following that flooding, temporary bridges were hastily assembled at this site; they were washed away during thaw floods in January 1928. The present bridge was built in spring 1928. The Berlin Construction Company, who built it, was in some ways a successor to the Berlin Iron Bridge Company, having been formed by employees of that company after its acquisition by the American Bridge Company.

See also
National Register of Historic Places listings in Windham County, Vermont
List of bridges on the National Register of Historic Places in Vermont

References

Road bridges on the National Register of Historic Places in Vermont
Bridges completed in 1928
Bridges in Windham County, Vermont
Buildings and structures in Brookline, Vermont
Buildings and structures in Newfane, Vermont
National Register of Historic Places in Windham County, Vermont
Iron bridges in the United States
Truss bridges in the United States